This is a list of notable Burgher people, who are a Eurasian ethnic group, historically from Sri Lanka, consisting for the most part of male-line descendants of European colonists from the 16th to 20th centuries (mostly Portuguese, Dutch, German and British) and local women, with some minorities of French and Irish.

Academics
 E. F. C. Ludowyk – Professor of English, Dean of the School of Arts, University of Ceylon
 Prof. E. O. E. Pereira – founding Dean of the Faculty of Engineering, University of Ceylon; Vice Chancellor Peradeniya

Civil servants
 Major General Bertram Heyn – Commander of Ceylon Army; cricket, field hockey and rugby star
 Neville Jansz – Sri Lankan diplomat
 M. C. Sansoni – Puisne Judge and then Chief Justice
 Sir Francis Soertsz – Supreme Court Judge
 Wilhelm Woutersz – Sri Lankan diplomat
 Dr. Richard Gerald Anthonisz - First Colonial Secretary and Chief Archivist of the National Archives of Ceylon.

Professionals
 Cecil Balmond – Structural engineer and architectural theoretician
 Louis Edmund Blaze – Educator and founder of Kingswood College, Kandy
 Frederick Dornhorst – Lawyer

Artists
 Jean Arasanayagam (née Solomonsz) – poet and painter
 William Wright Beling – painter and father of Geoffrey Beling
 George Keyt – painter and founding member of Colombo '43 Group
 J. L. K. van Dort – 19th-century artist
 Lionel Wendt – photographer and founder of the Colombo '43 Group

Authors
 David Blacker – author and blogger, winner of the State Literary Award for Best Novel in 2006
 Michelle de Kretser - Australian novelist
 Carl Muller – prolific author of many books including The Jam Fruit Tree, The Yakada Yaka, Once Upon a Tender Time and Children of the Lion
 Michael Ondaatje – Canadian poet and author of numerous novels, including The English Patient
 Leah Lakshmi Piepzna-Samarasinha – poet and activist
 Rosemary Rogers – best-selling author of romance novels in the USA; has been on the New York Times best-sellers list
 Vivimarie Vanderpoorten – poet, winner of Gratiaen Prize 2009

Journalists
 Frederica Jansz – Sri Lanka journalist, editor of The Sunday Leader

Politics
 Peter Daniel Anthonisz – first President of the Ceylon Branch of British Medical Association; member of the Legislative Council
 Professor David de Kretser – professor and Director for the Institute of Reproduction and Development, Monash University; former Governor of Victoria, Australia
 Pieter Keuneman – Sri Lankan politician
 Quint Ondaatje – Dutch patriot and politician
 Beverley Pinder – Councillor, City of Melbourne, Australia; former Miss Australia

Chefs
 Geoff Jansz – Australian TV chef
 Charmaine Solomon – Australian resident chef and well-known writer of Asian cookbooks

Musicians and entertainers
 Vasanthi Chathurani – actress
 Elaine Cole – baila dancer
 Danielle de Niese – Australian-American opera singer
 Stuart de Silva – Sri Lankan jazz pianist and actor
 Jamie Durie – Australian media personality
 Jacqueline Fernandez – actor; Miss Universe 2006 contestant
 Cliff Foenander – musician
 Anton Jones – baila singer
 Desmond Kelly – Australian musician; actor
 Alston Koch – Australian musician
 Douglas Meerwald –  singer
 Keith Potger – musician; member of The Seekers; founder of The New Seekers
 Gresha Schuilling – musician
 Guy Sebastian – Australian singer
 Gina Zamparelli – Los Angeles-based concert promoter

Fashion and models
 Nigel Barker – fashion photographer
 Ramani Bartholomeusz – actress and model, represented Sri Lanka in the Miss Universe 1985 pageant
 Sabrina Herft – Miss Sri Lanka for Miss Universe 2012
 Maureen Hingert – represented Sri Lanka (then Ceylon) when Ceylon took part for the first time at the 1954 Miss Universe pageant; second runner-up
 Dannielle Kerkoven – model and Former Miss Sri Lanka for Miss. World-2006

Athletes
 Graeme Labrooy – former Sri Lankan cricketer
 Sir Christopher Ondaatje – former athlete; philanthropist
 Laddie Outschoorn – England cricketer (Worcestershire County Cricket Club, 1946–1959); Cap 1948
 Michael Vandort – Sri Lankan cricketer
 Jeffrey Vandersay - Sri Lankan cricketer
 Duncan White – Sri Lankan (then Ceylonese) 440m silver medalist at the London Olympics in 1948; gold medalist 1950 Empire games

See also
 List of Sri Lankans

References

Burgher
 
Burgher